The Al-Batin Club Stadium is a multi-use stadium in Hafar al-Batin, Saudi Arabia. It is currently used mostly for football matches and is the home stadium of Al-Batin. The stadium has a capacity of 6,000 seats. It was opened in April 2016.

See also
List of sports venues in Saudi Arabia
List of football stadiums in Saudi Arabia

References

External links
Soccerway Profile

2016 establishments in Saudi Arabia
Football venues in Saudi Arabia